John Krug (March 23, 1880 – September 30, 1933) was an American wrestler. He competed in the men's freestyle lightweight at the 1908 Summer Olympics.

References

1880 births
1933 deaths
American male sport wrestlers
Olympic wrestlers of the United States
Wrestlers at the 1908 Summer Olympics
Sportspeople from Newark, New Jersey